Hiroshima National Peace Memorial Hall for the Atomic Bomb Victims is one of the National Memorial Halls in Hiroshima, Japan.

Overview
The Hall was founded by the Japanese national government to mourn the atomic bomb victims in 2002. It was designed by Kenzo Tange.  There is another National Peace Memorial Hall for the Atomic Bomb Victims in Nagasaki built for the same purpose.

The Hall is in Hiroshima Peace Memorial Park near Hiroshima Peace Memorial across the "Motoyasu River" by "Motoyasu Bridge".  The Hall curators are collecting atomic bomb memories and stories from the survivors to mourn the victims, as the survivors are aging. They are also collecting names and photographs of atomic bomb victims for the same purpose and for the same reason. From the collection, they are developing a project to "read the stories of the atomic bombing".

Admission is free of charge.

See also

Atomic bombings of Hiroshima and Nagasaki
Hiroshima Peace Memorial Park
Hiroshima Peace Memorial
Hiroshima Witness
Nagasaki National Peace Memorial Hall for the Atomic Bomb Victims

External links
Hiroshima National Peace Memorial Hall for the Atomic Bomb Victims

Aftermath of World War II in Japan
Monuments and memorials in Japan
Tourist attractions in Hiroshima
Monuments and memorials concerning the atomic bombings of Hiroshima and Nagasaki
Buildings and structures in Hiroshima